The Railway Operating Division (ROD) was a division of the Royal Engineers formed in 1915 to operate railways in the many theatres of the First World War.  It was largely composed of railway employees and operated both standard gauge and narrow gauge railways.

The ROD operated their first line on a section of the Hazebrouck–Ypres line. The work was carried out by former employees of the London and North Western Railway.

The ROD requisitioned many diverse locomotives from Britain's railway companies and leased several Belgian locomotives sent to France in 1914, but as the war dragged on adopted the Great Central Railway's Robinson Class 8K 2-8-0 as its standard freight locomotive to become the ROD 2-8-0. Some locomotives were also purchased from Baldwin in the United States.

They also operated narrow-gauge engines (meter gauge or  gauge trains).

After the war, requisitioned locomotives returned to their foreign owners.

 the ROD 2-8-0 were stored in Great Britain and sold to several British companies between 1919 and 1927.
 the Baldwin locomotives were sold as military surplus; most of them ended up in Belgium and France.
During the First World War, the Railway Operating Division were assisted in their duties by other army units. The 17th Battalion, Northumberland Fusiliers. The Battalion, a Pals Battalion raised by the North Eastern Railway, began its life as a regular infantry battalion. It later became a Pioneer battalion and, owing to the large number of railwaymen available, became a Railway Pioneer battalion in October 1916 working under General Headquarters (GHQ) Railway Construction Troops. In September 1917, the battalion returned to an infantry battalion but returned to GHQ in November. They finally returned to an infantry battalion in May 1918, where they remained until the end of the war.

Railway Construction Companies 
A number of Railway Construction Companies existed during the great war. The companies built standard gauge railways in combate zones on multiple fronts during the war. At the start of the First World War there were two regular and three special reserve, these were:

 8th Railway Company
 10th Railway Company
 Depot Company
 Royal Anglesey (1 company)
 Royal Monmouthshire (1 company)

It was soon realised the importance of railways on the front line, several more companies were raised for the duration of the war. The last company was demobilised in 1919.

Great War companies included:

See also
 War Department Light Railways homepage

References

United Kingdom in World War I
Military railways in the United Kingdom
Military logistics of World War I